Whose Are You, Old People? is a 1988 Soviet drama film directed by Iosif Kheifits.

Plot 
The film tells about two lonely old people living in one village.

Cast 
 Mikhail Pakhomenko as Kasyan Glushkov
 Lev Borisov as Bagorych
  Elena Melnikova  as Valentina, Bagorych's granddaughter
  Yevgeny Kryzhanovsky as Arnold, neighbor in a communal apartment (as Yevgeni Krzhizhanovsky)
 Tatyana Sharkova as Zinka, Kasyan's daughter-in-law
 Yevgeniya Kovalyova as Nyura, neighbor in the village
 Irina Rakshina as Vera, Nyura's daughter
 Anatoliy Kotenyov as Andrey
 Valentin Bukin as Podkhodtsev
  Yuri Golubev  as Golubev

References

External links 
 

1988 films
1980s Russian-language films
Soviet drama films
1988 drama films
Lenfilm films
Films based on Russian novels
Films directed by Iosif Kheifits
Films based on works by Boris Vasilyev
1980s buddy drama films
Films about old age